Douglas Forvis Espinoza (born 17 May 1992) is a footballer who plays as a goalkeeper for Santos (Guápiles). Born in Costa Rica, he plays for the Nicaragua national team.

Career

As a youth player, Forvis joined the youth academy of Saprissa, Costa Rica's most successful club. After that, he signed for Liberia in the Costa Rican second division, helping them achieve promotion to the Costa Rican top flight.

In 2018, he signed for Costa Rican top flight side Santos (Guápiles).

International career
Born in Costa Rica, Forvis is of Jamaican descent through a grandmother. He moved to Nicaragua as a young age and is a naturalized citizen of the country. He debuted with the Nicaragua national team in a 2–0 friendly win over Cuba on 14 November 2021.

References

External links
 
 

Living people
1992 births
People from Guanacaste Province
Nicaraguan men's footballers
Nicaragua international footballers
Costa Rican footballers
Nicaraguan people of Costa Rican descent]
Nicaraguan people of Jamaican descent]
Costa Rican people of Jamaican descent
Costa Rican emigrants to Nicaragua
Association football goalkeepers
Municipal Liberia footballers
Santos de Guápiles footballers
Liga FPD players